Cheng Po-jen (born 17 October 1982 in Taiwan) is a Taiwanese baseball player who currently plays for Uni-President Lions of Chinese Professional Baseball League. He currently plays as short reliever for the Lions.

See also
 Chinese Professional Baseball League
 Uni-President Lions

References

1982 births
Living people
Baseball pitchers
Sportspeople from Taipei
Taiwanese baseball players
Uni-President 7-Eleven Lions players
Uni-President 7-Eleven Lions coaches